Inge II may refer to:

Inge II of Sweden, Ingold Halstensson, also called Inge the Younger, king of Sweden in 1110–1125
Inge II of Norway, Inge Baardson (1185–1217)